The 2016–17 season was the Manitoba Junior Hockey League's (MJHL) 100th season of operation.  Players and officials wore patches to commemorate Hockey Manitoba and the MJHL's centennial anniversary.

The Steinbach Pistons finished with league's best regular season record for the first time in their franchise's history, however were defeated by the two-time defending champion Portage Terriers in the semi-finals.   The Terriers, despite finishing fifth overall in the regular season, won the Turnbull Cup for a third consecutive season by defeating the OCN Blizzard in the final.

Season highlights
The league announces the discontinuation of the Survivor Series playoff round. Only the top eight teams now advance to the playoffs.
Three-on-three play is adopted for overtime during the regular season.
The annual Showcase moves from October to December, with this year's event held December 12–14 at the MTS Iceplex.
In December 2016, the Opaskwayak Cree Nation band council announce their intention to fold the OCN Blizzard following the conclusion of the season.  After the Blizzard's board of directors make a pitch to operate the team independently, the council permits the team to continue but without funding from the band.

Standings

Playoffs

Post MJHL playoffs
Western Canada Cup
Portage Terriers finish fifth in round robin and are eliminated from playoffs.
Hockey Canada announces the end of the Western Canada Cup format.  The MJHL and Saskatchewan Junior Hockey League will resume their Anavet Cup rivalry next season.

League awards 
 Steve "Boomer" Hawrysh Award (MVP): Brady Keeper, OCN
 MJHL Top Goaltender Award: Roman Bengert, Steinbach
 Brian Kozak Award (Top Defenceman): Brady Keeper, OCN
 Vince Leah Trophy (Rookie of the Year): Cole Weaver, Winkler
 Lorne Lyndon Memorial Trophy (Hockey Ability and Sportsmanship): Jeremey Leipsic, Portage
 Muzz McPherson Award (Coach of the Year): Paul Dyck, Steinbach
 Mike Ridley Trophy (Scoring Champion): Jeremey Leipsic, Portage
 MJHL Playoff MVP: Jeremey Leipsic, Portage

See also
2017 Western Canada Cup
2017 Royal Bank Cup

References

External links
 MJHL Website
 2016-17 MJHL season at HockeyDB.com

Manitoba Junior Hockey League seasons
MJHL